Jalan Jorak (Johor state route J141) is a major road in Johor, Malaysia.

List of junctions

Roads in Johor